Amari Aaron Morgan-Smith (born 3 April 1989) is an English professional footballer who plays as a striker for Kidderminster Harriers. He has previously played for Crewe Alexandra, Alsager Town, Stockport County, Ilkeston Town, Luton Town, Macclesfield Town, Kidderminster Harriers, Oldham Athletic, Cheltenham Town and York City.

Club career

Early career
Born in Wolverhampton, West Midlands, Morgan-Smith began his career in the youth system at Crewe Alexandra. He went on loan to Northern Premier League First Division club Alsager Town late in the 2006–07 season. Morgan-Smith was released in the summer of 2007, before going on trial at Stockport County with 150 other players through the club's Just Search campaign. He was one of just two players signed by Stockport on 5 September 2007 on a one-year professional contract. He made his debut for Stockport on 3 May 2008, coming on as a 66th-minute substitute in a 1–0 home victory over Brentford. Morgan-Smith was released by the club a month later.

Ilkeston Town
He joined Northern Premier League Premier Division club Ilkeston Town in the summer of 2008, helping the club earn promotion to the Conference North in 2008–09 with a 2–1 win over Nantwich Town on 3 May 2009 in the play-off final. Following his scoring prowess, Ilkeston manager Kevin Wilson described Morgan-Smith as "one of the hottest properties in non-league football". During the summer of 2010, Morgan-Smith trained with Championship club Derby County on a trial period, though the club opted against signing him. On 8 September, Ilkeston were liquidated by HM Revenue and Customs over a £50,000 unpaid tax bill. Morgan-Smith was therefore released from the club with immediate effect. He joined League One club Carlisle United on trial on 21 September, but was not offered a contract.

Luton Town

On 28 September 2010, he joined Conference Premier club Luton Town on a two-year contract. He played the same day in a 2–0 victory over Mansfield Town, scoring on his debut. Morgan-Smith scored a hat-trick for the club in a 4–0 FA Cup win against St Albans City on 23 October 2010. This led to him winning the award for Player of the Round.

Morgan-Smith started 2011–12 on form, scoring nine goals in 13 league matches, before a succession of serious injuries kept him out for most of the remaining campaign. The uncertainty over his fitness led to Luton manager Paul Buckle releasing him from his contract in June 2012.

He was taken on trial by League One club Doncaster Rovers during pre-season, scoring against Hull City in a friendly, but was not offered a contract.

Macclesfield Town
On 31 August 2012, Morgan-Smith signed for Conference Premier club Macclesfield Town on a one-year contract. He made his debut for the club on 1 September 2012 in a 4–1 defeat against his former club Luton Town.

On 31 January 2013, he signed on loan for Kidderminster Harriers for a month. He made five appearances for the club, scoring in a 3–1 victory over Alfreton Town. He was recalled from his loan early by Macclesfield and went on to play in eight further matches, scoring twice. He was released at the end of the season after scoring four goals in 28 appearances.

Kidderminster Harriers
After training with Mansfield Town and his former club Luton Town in the summer of 2013, Morgan-Smith signed for Kidderminster Harriers on a short-term contract on 5 September 2013. He scored two goals in a 4–1 win against Forest Green Rovers on 8 October 2013. On 11 November 2013, he extended his contract until the end of the season after impressing with 3 goals in 11 appearances.

Manager Gary Whild stated on 4 June 2014 that it was likely Morgan-Smith would be leaving the club. Morgan-Smith turned down the offer of a new contract.

Oldham Athletic
He signed for League One club Oldham Athletic on 21 July 2014 on a one-year contract, with the option of a further year.

Cheltenham Town
On 29 May 2015, Morgan-Smith signed a one-year contract with newly relegated National League club Cheltenham Town.

York City and A.F.C. Telford United
On 12 January 2017, Morgan-Smith joined National League club York City on loan until the end of 2016–17. On 21 May 2017, he started as York beat Macclesfield Town 3–2 at Wembley Stadium in the 2017 FA Trophy Final. He was released by Cheltenham at the end of 2016–17.

On 30 June 2017, Morgan-Smith re-signed for York City permanently on a one-year contract.

He signed for York's National League North rivals A.F.C. Telford United on 2 February 2018 on a one-and-a-half-year contract.

Alfreton Town
On 13 July 2019, Morgan-Smith joined Alfreton Town.

2nd spell at Kidderminster 
On 25 June 2020, Morgan-Smith resigned for Kidderminster Harriers on a one-year contract, almost 8 years after first joining on loan from Macclesfield. The transfer fee was paid personally by the Harrier's owners during the COVID-19 Pandemic to ensure no impact to the club finances. He scored twice in a pre-season friendly vs Alvechurch that September, as league start dates were pushed back to October due to the pandemic. Across the 2021-22 season, Morgan-Smith scored 17 goals, including one against Reading FC in the FA Cup 3rd Round. Amari (colloquially abbreviated to AMS around the club) became an integral part of the Harriers line-up and, on the 13th of April 2022, extended his deal until the end of the 2022-23 season.

International career
Morgan-Smith was called up to the England national C team for a match against the Republic of Ireland under-23 team in May 2010, in which he made his debut. He was capped twice by England C from 2010 to 2011.

Career statistics

Honours
Ilkeston Town
Northern Premier League Premier Division play-offs: 2008–09

Cheltenham Town
National League: 2015–16

York City
FA Trophy: 2016–17

References

External links

Amari Morgan-Smith profile at the A.F.C. Telford United website

1989 births
Living people
Footballers from Wolverhampton
English footballers
England semi-pro international footballers
Association football forwards
Crewe Alexandra F.C. players
Alsager Town F.C. players
Stockport County F.C. players
Ilkeston Town F.C. (1945) players
Luton Town F.C. players
Macclesfield Town F.C. players
Kidderminster Harriers F.C. players
Oldham Athletic A.F.C. players
Cheltenham Town F.C. players
York City F.C. players
AFC Telford United players
Alfreton Town F.C. players
Northern Premier League players
English Football League players
National League (English football) players
Black British sportspeople